Martina Ćorković (born on 4 July 1993) is a Croatian handballer who plays for the Croatian national team.

International honours

EHF Challenge Cup:
Bronze Medalist: 2015

Individual awards 
 Croatian First League Top Scorer: 2014

References

1993 births
Living people 
Handball players from Zagreb
Croatian female handball players
Expatriate handball players 
Croatian expatriate sportspeople in France
Croatian expatriate sportspeople in Turkey
Croatian expatriate sportspeople in Romania
Beach handball players
21st-century Croatian women